Dowling Park is an unincorporated community located in Suwannee County, Florida, United States.

Demographics
Dowling Park had 7,604 people as of July 2007. The average age of a person is 44.6. The Estimated median household income in 2009 is $32,174 it was $29,936 in 2000. Race: White alone - 6,217 (92.1%) Hispanic - 320 (4.7%) Black alone - 94 (1.4%) Two or more races - 60 (0.9%) American Indian alone - 36 (0.5%) Asian alone - 19 (0.3%) Native Hawaiian and Other Pacific Islander alone - 1 (0.01%).

See also

References

External links

Unincorporated communities in Suwannee County, Florida
Unincorporated communities in Florida